Ramtek was an American manufacturer of computers, computer graphics displays, and coin-operated video games founded in 1971. It became a publicly held corporation in 1978.
In 1981 it was generally regarded as the No. 1 company in the area of raster-scan color graphics display, printer/plotter or large screen projector.
Its business was split among general-purpose graphics, applications in government, applications in the medical field and process control.

History 
 1979 Ramtek bought Omron's CRT manufacturing division for $1.6 million.

Products

6000 series graphics computer family 
 6114 Color-graphic Computer (1979)
 6214 Color-graphic Computer (1980) with 16 displayable colors from a palette of 64 and using UCSD Pascal. It uses 4 MHz Zilog Z80 CPU, 64 kB RAM and a floppy disk drive, with a base price of $19,250
 2020-4228 CAD workstation (1985) with 750 kB RAM (expandable to 5 MB) and a base price of $10,995

Terminals 
 Ramtek 8210/UET interactive data entry terminal compatible with UNIVAC computers

Arcade video games 

 Clean Sweep (June 1974) Genre: Ball and Paddle It is considered to be a primitive predecessor to Atari's Breakout (1976). The player uses a paddle to hit a ball up towards a playfield of dots, which disappear as the ball moves through the dots; the goal is to is to achieve a clean sweep by erasing all the dots. Clean Sweep was one of the top ten best-selling arcade video games of 1974, and sold a total of 3,500 arcade cabinets.
 Baseball (October 1974) Genre: Sports
 Barricade (1976) Genre: Skill
 Dark Invader (1978) Genre: Space
 Deluxe Baseball (1976) Genre: Baseball
 GT Roadster (1979) Genre: Racing
 Hit Me (1976) Genre: Card
 Hockey (1973) Genre: Ball and Paddle
 Horoscope (1976)
 M-79 Ambush (1977) Genre: Shooter
 Sea Battle (1976) Genre: Shooter
 Soccer (1973) Genre: Ball and Paddle
 Star Cruiser (1977) Genre: Shooter	
 Trivia (1976)
 Volly (1973) Genre: Ball and Paddle a Pong clone
 Wipe Out (1974) Genre: Ball and Paddle

Other products 
 Ramtek 3000
 Ramtek 9000 Series Display Controller
 Ramtek 9050 Series Display Controller

Notes

External links 
 The Ultimate (So Far) History of Exidy Part 1, May 19, 2013, allincolorforaquarter.blogspot.com
 Manufacturer: Ramtek, The International Arcade Museum

Video game companies of the United States